Chesterford Park Research Station was a former crop protection research centre in Essex, and is now a science park with biotechnology companies.

History
The 808 acres of the Chesterford Park Estate was put up for sale in June 1950. 
, owned by Dr Werner Göthe since around 1930.

Pest Control Ltd of Bourn in south-west Cambridgeshire, bought the Little Chesterford Park site in 1952. The Bourn site made crop spraying equipment. Fisons bought Pest Control Ltd in early 1954.

Elwyn Parry-Jones was the site's first technical director, who died in July 1965.

In September 1964 the site started research work with Boots.

Genetic resistance by insects to insecticides was increasing in the late 1960s. By the late 1960s, the site had around 220 staff.

From the 1970s, the director of the site was Charles Edwards.

By the late 1980s, there were around 500 staff.

The site is accessed via the B184 from junction 9 of the M11 motorway.

Ownership
Boots and Fisons joined divisions in 1980 to form FBC Limited. In 1982 Fisons sold its fertiliser division to a Norwegian company for £50m. On Monday 18 July 1983, Boots and Fisons sold FBC Ltd to Schering AG of West Germany for £120m with the sale completed on Wednesday 14 September 1983.

In late 1993, Schering's chemical division looked at merging with another German chemical company Hoechst, which formed AgrEvo on 3 March 1994.

In July 1999 AgrEvo UK looked at closing the site due to Hoechst merging, to become Aventis. The site briefly became part of Aventis CropScience UK. On 12 October 2001 Aventis CropScience was bought for 7.25 billion euros.

Construction
New buildings were opened on Tuesday 2 October 1956 by Sir William Slater. The new buildings included a Medical Laboratory for tests on laboratory animals. The buildings were built by Prime Ltd of Cambridge. The site was around 240 acres - there was 90 acres of woodland and a 139-acre farm.

In 1967 a new animal health unit opened, with a £30,000 pig unit, and £30,000 building for a dairy herd.

In the late 1970s, a £4.5m building was built. The new centre was opened on Tuesday 24 April 1979 by Scottish biochemist Alexander R. Todd, who won the 1957 Nobel Prize in Chemistry.

Research
From 1954 it conducted research on TCA, which it sold under the tradename Tecane

Insecticides had radioactive tracers to test uptake by insects.

In 1942, the herbicide DNOC - dinitro-ortho-cresol was found, but it was harmful to humans. In 1956, the site found a way to reduce the harmful effects. MCPA was found in 1945, but DNOC was better, as MCPA had resistance.

In February 1958, a team under Dr Pfeiffer discovered TCB.

In April 1977, the site won a Queen's Award for Industry, for the Norton herbicide, made at a new £3.5m factory in Widnes, with 350 workers, which opened in October 1976; it was awarded on Friday 8 September 1977.

Animal research
Environmental toxicity was tested on rodents such as mice, rats, and hamsters, and on rabbits, ducks and chickens, by radioactive tracers. Various types of insects were kept. In the late 1950s, it conducted research around £250,000 a year.

Visits
The Duke of Kent visited the site on the morning of Tuesday 23 January 2013

Prince Philip, Duke of Edinburgh visited the Fisons Pest Control site on the afternoon of Friday 18 October 1963, initially travelling by aircraft, and later personally piloting a red-coloured helicopter; he had visited Shell in Kent in the morning,  and the day before he had visited the ICI plant protection research centre in Berkshire. The Duke met James Turner, 1st Baron Netherthorpe, the chairman of Fisons, and Sir John Carmichael, the deputy chairman.

See also
 British Industrial Biological Research Association

References

External links
 UK Science Park Association
 Chesterford Research Park

1952 establishments in England
Agricultural organisations based in England
Agricultural research institutes in the United Kingdom
Chemical research institutes
Crop protection organizations
Environmental toxicology
Horticultural organisations based in the United Kingdom
Mycology organizations
Pesticides in the United Kingdom
Research institutes established in 1952
Science and technology in Essex
Science parks in the United Kingdom
Toxicology in the United Kingdom
Uttlesford